The Men's 100 metre backstroke S7 swimming event at the 2004 Summer Paralympics was competed on 22 September. It was won by Andrew Lindsay, representing .

1st round

Heat 1
22 September 2004, morning session

Heat 2
22 September 2004, morning session

Final round

22 September 2004, evening session

References

M